coala is a free and open-source language independent analysis toolkit, written in Python. The primary goal of coala is to make it easier for developers to create rules which a project's code should conform to. coala emphasizes on reusability and pluggability of analysis routines, and the principle of don't repeat yourself (DRY).

On 6 May it was featured on SDTimes.com as GitHub Project of the Week. coala was also featured in the hackerpublicradio. On 9 May 2016, an article was published on Medium by Gitter regarding its community.

Features

Bears 

Bears in coala are the equivalent plugins or extensions which provide some analysis routines. Bears can be language dependent as well as language independent. The language dependent bears supported by the coala community provide analysis routines for more than 30 languages.

Integrations 

Integrations with a few editors/IDEs have been supported. This includes:

 Atom
 Sublime Text 3
 Vim
 gedit
 Emacs
 Eclipse

There are also interfaces with different visualizations provided like the web interface, command-line, D-Bus, and JSON.

Version History

External links
 
 coala Official documentation

References

Free software programmed in Python
Static program analysis tools
Software using the GNU AGPL license
Software quality